Perigonia pittieri is a moth of the  family Sphingidae. It is known from Venezuela, French Guiana and Brazil.

The length of the forewings is 24–27 mm for males and about 29 mm for females. It is similar to Perigonia stulta but the forewing outer margin is more evenly curved and the apex is obtuse. Furthermore, its upperside pattern is less contrasting and more uniform and the antemedian band is either straight or only slightly curved.

References

Perigonia
Moths described in 1962